The Rhathymini are a tribe of kleptoparasitic apid bees ("cuckoo bees").

Genera
Nanorhathymus
Rhathymus

References
C. D. Michener (2000) The Bees of the World, Johns Hopkins University Press.

Apinae
Bee tribes
Taxa named by Amédée Louis Michel le Peletier